Route 203, also known as Fair Haven Road, is a  north–south highway along the Avalon Peninsula on the island of Newfoundland. It connects the community of Fair Haven with Bellevue and the Trans-Canada Highway. There are no other major intersections or communities along its entire length, and as with most highways in Newfoundland and Labrador, it is entirely a two-lane highway.

Major intersections

References

203